Coleophora japonicella is a moth of the family Coleophoridae. It is found in Japan and Korea.

The wingspan is about 10.5 mm for males and 11–13 mm for females.

The larvae feed on Ulmus davidiana var. japonica. They create a brownish-grey leaf-case which is slightly bent towards the base and 11–12 mm in length. The larvae mine into the leaf of their host plant until mid-June, but some are full-grown before hibernation.

References

japonicella
Moths described in 1965
Moths of Japan
Moths of Korea